Mazes and Monsters (also known as Rona Jaffe's Mazes and Monsters) is a 1982 American made-for-television film directed by Steven Hilliard Stern about a group of college students and their interest in a fictitious role-playing game (RPG) of the same name.

The film starred Tom Hanks in his first acting lead role at age 26.

Plot
The film opens with a scene that is revisited later in which a reporter meets with police searching a cavern.  He is told a game of Mazes and Monsters got out of hand.

Robbie Wheeling (Tom Hanks) starts college at the fictional Grant University and soon develops a group of friends, all of whom have their own personal problems and issues. Jay-Jay (Chris Makepeace) feels marginalized by his mother, who constantly redecorates his room since she cannot make up her mind about the best look. In his "self-decorating", he wears a variety of unusual hats. Kate (Wendy Crewson) has had a series of failed relationships, and suffers from her father leaving home; Daniel's (David Wallace) parents reject his dream of becoming a video game designer; and Robbie's alcoholic mother and strict father fight constantly, and he is still tormented by the mysterious disappearance of his brother, Hall. They are fans of Mazes and Monsters, a fantasy role-playing game that had previously caused Robbie to get kicked out of his last school when he became too obsessed with it. Though he is reluctant, the other three students convince him to start playing again with them.

Through the course of playing the game, Robbie and Kate begin a serious relationship, in which he confides in her that he still has nightmares about his missing brother. Eventually, Jay-Jay, upset by feeling left out by his friends, decides to commit suicide in a local cavern. In the process of planning it out, he changes his mind and decides the cavern would be better suited to a new Mazes and Monsters campaign. He dramatically kills off his character to force them to start a new campaign, in which he describes they will be living out their fantasy. He proposes playing his new game in a disused and condemned cavern, and dismisses the warnings from his friends – who reluctantly agree to participate.

During the actual spelunking, Robbie experiences a psychotic episode involving the last time he saw his brother, and he hallucinates that he has slain a monster, called a Gorvil. From this point forward, Robbie believes he is actually his character, the cleric Pardieu. This leads him to break off his relationship with Kate (to maintain celibacy), and to start drawing maps that will lead him to a sacred place he has seen in his dreams called the Great Hall. In his dream, the Great Hall tells him to go to the Two Towers, and he disappears.

His friends report him to the police while concealing their trip into the caverns. They and police investigators suspect he is deceased. Robbie travels to New York City, where he stabs a mugger whom he imagines to be a monster. He sees blood on his knife, then sees his bloodied clothes in a window and breaks out of his delusions for long enough to call Kate from a payphone. After he agrees to go to Jay-Jay's house, a delusion leads him into the subway. Not finding him at Jay-Jay's house, the friends deduce Robbie has equated the Two Towers with the Twin Towers of the World Trade Center. Robbie believes that by jumping off one of them and casting a spell, he will finally join the Great Hall. After a search, his friends find him and stop him from jumping off the south tower observation deck using the game's rules, once again pulling him out of his delusion.

The film ends with the friends visiting Robbie at his parents' estate, hoping to pick up their friendship where they left off. Though he is now in regular counseling, it is implied that Robbie will live out the rest of his life trapped in his imaginary world believing that he is still Pardieu, that his friends are really their characters, and that he is living at an inn (actually his parents' home) and paying for his boarding with a magic coin, which "magically" reappears in his pouch each morning. He then tells his shocked friends of a great evil lurking in the forest across the lake, believing that it threatens the lives of the "innkeeper" and his wife. The three, feeling sorry for Robbie and guilty for their role in his psychotic break, decide to engage him in a "game" of Mazes and Monsters, letting Robbie dictate the events to them. In the end, Kate says, "And so ... we played the game again ... for one last time."

Cast
 Tom Hanks as Robbie Wheeling
 Chris Makepeace as Jay "Jay-Jay" Brockway
 Wendy Crewson as Kate Finch
 David Wysocki as Daniel 
 Lloyd Bochner as Hall
 Peter Donat as Harold
 Louise Sorel as Julia
 Susan Strasberg as Meg
 Anne Francis as Ellie
 Murray Hamilton as Lieutenant John Martini
 Vera Miles as Cat
 Chris Wiggins as King
 Kevin Peter Hall as Gorvil

Production 
The film was adapted from the novel Mazes and Monsters by Rona Jaffe. Jaffe had based her 1981 novel on inaccurate newspaper stories about the disappearance of James Dallas Egbert III from Michigan State University in 1979. Early media accounts had over-emphasized Egbert's participation in fantasy role playing, often speculating that his hobby of Dungeons & Dragons might have been a factor in his disappearance. William Dear, the private investigator on the case, explained actual events and the reasons behind the media myth in his 1984 book The Dungeon Master. Jaffe wrote her novel in a matter of days because of a fear that another author might also be fictionalizing the Egbert investigation.

Like the book on which it is based, the film touches on the claim that the playing of role-playing games could be related to psychological problems. At least one protagonist is (or at least appears to be) suffering from schizophrenia (or some analogous condition).

Home media
The film has been available on VHS tape, DVD and various streaming services. The film received a 40th anniversary blu-ray release in 2022, which was its first high definition version. It was published by Plumeria Pictures on 19 September.

See also

References

External links
 
 
 RPGnet review
 Mazes and Monsters review by Ironic Consumer
 "The Disappearance of James Dallas Egbert III" by Shaun Hately
 "The Attacks on Role-Playing Games" by Paul Cardwell, Jr.

1980s American films
1982 drama films
1982 fantasy films
1982 films
1982 television films
Adaptations of works by Rona Jaffe
American drama television films
American fantasy films
CBS network films
Films based on American novels
Films directed by Steven Hilliard Stern
History of role-playing games
Warner Bros. films